Lauretta of Saarbrücken (died 1271), was a sovereign countess regnant of Saarbrücken from 1233 to 1271.

After the death of his son Dietrich in 1227, her father chose Lauretta as his heiress as Countess of Saarbrücken, with an official statement with the Bishop of Metz, and gave a part of the county to each of the daughters (mentioning "Joffroi d'Aspremont, Lorate, Mahaus & Jehane"). She succeeded Simon as the Countess of Saarbrücken at his death in 1233.

Both husbands were considered counts jure uxoris from 1243 to 1259 when Dietrich returned to Cleves (Kleve). Loretta and Dietrich had a young daughter, Richardis (d.a. 1326), who was not yet married, and Loretta let her sister Mathilde inherit the county. 
Richardis married 1285 to Gerlach II (d.b. 1325) Herr of Dollendorf and Kronenburg, probably son of Gerlach I of Dollendorf, and they had at least one child.

Notes

1271 deaths
13th-century women rulers
Year of birth unknown
Counts of Saarbrücken